Bicyclopentane may refer to:

 Bicyclo[1.1.1]pentane
 Bicyclo[2.1.0]pentane (housane)
  (cyclopentylcyclopentane)

See also
 Bicyclic compound
 Bicyclobutane
 Spiropentane

Bicyclic compounds